Błonie railway station is a railway station in Błonie, Poland.  The station is served by Koleje Mazowieckie, who run trains from Kutno to Warszawa Wschodnia.

References
Station article at kolej.one.pl

Railway stations in Poland opened in 1902
Warsaw West County
Railway stations served by Koleje Mazowieckie
Railway stations in Masovian Voivodeship